Mamador (ままどおる) is a cake-like Japanese sweet from Fukushima.

History 
Mamador means "Sucker" '' in Spanish. Mamador sold from 1967 in Sanmangoku. Chocolate Mamador also available for a limited time, from October to June. In 2018, Mamador price rose from 80 yen to 100 yen because of rising wheat prices.

Mamadors are cake-like and have an azuki bean filling.

See also 
Miyagegashi
Usukawa Manju
List of Japanese dessert and sweets

References

External links 
Official website (Japanese).

Culture in Fukushima Prefecture
Japanese desserts and sweets
Japanese snack food